Streptomyces leeuwenhoekii is a bacterium species from the genus of Streptomyces which has been isolated from hyper-arid desert soil from Salar de Atacama in Chile. Streptomyces leeuwenhoekii produces chaxalactins and chaxamycins.

See also 
 List of Streptomyces species

References

Further reading

External links
Type strain of Streptomyces leeuwenhoekii at BacDive –  the Bacterial Diversity Metadatabase

leeuwenhoekii
Bacteria described in 2014